The Recorder of Manchester or, since 1971, the  Honorary Recorder of Manchester is a legal office in the City of Manchester, England. The Recorder is appointed by the Crown. The Recorder of Manchester is also a Senior Circuit Judge of the Manchester Crown Court in the North West Circuit. They are addressed in court as "My Lord" or "My Lady".

List of Recorders of Manchester

1839 (April–May) John Frederick Foster
1839–1865 Robert Baynes Armstrong
1865–1893 Henry Wyndham West QC 
1893–1914 Sir Joseph Francis Leese KC
1914–1925 Arthur Jacob Ashton KC 
1925–1935 Sir Walter Greaves-Lord KC
1935–1956 Sir Noel Barré Goldie QC
1956–1960 Sir Basil Nield QC
1960–1967 (John) Robertson Dunn Crichton QC
1967–1971 William Gerard Morris

Honorary Recorders of Manchester
1971–1977 H H Judge Sir William Gerard Morris
1977–1982 H H Judge Sir Rudolph Lyons QC
1982–1990 H H Judge Arthur Miller Prestt QC
1990–2003 H H Judge Sir Rhys Everson Davies QC
2003–2008 H H Judge David Maddison
2008–2013 H H Judge Andrew Gilbart
2013– 2020 H H Judge David Stockdale
2020 - H H Judge Nicholas Dean QC

References

 
Manchester
Lawyers from Manchester